Hsiao Huang-chi (born 22 September 1976) is a Taiwanese singer, songwriter and former judoka (2nd dan black belt). He represented Taiwan in FESPIC Games in Beijing in 1994, where he won the bronze title and placed seventh at the 1996 Atlanta Paralympics. Hsiao gained attention in the Hokkien pop scene after winning the Best Male Vocalist – Taiwanese award at the 19th Golden Melody Awards in 2008.

Hsiao had congenital cataracts which led him to his blindness at birth, which was partially cured by surgery when he was 4. However his vision gradually deteriorated, and he completely lost his eyesight at age 15.

Hsiao had also gained a license to practice as a therapeutic masseur in high school. In 2012, he opened a massage clinic in Taipei, that employs blind and deaf people.

Discography

Studio album 
 2002 You Are My Eyes
 2004 Black Guitar
 2006 Our Story
 2007 True Love
 2008 I am Ricky Hsiao
 2009 Man Who Loved Dreaming
 2011 Lonely Chords
 2011 Scripture of Reminiscence
 2013 Good Sir
 2014 The Most Beautiful Flower
 2016 Mysterious World
 2017 Cheers
 2019 Migratory Bird
 2021 Stage
 2022 A Storytelling Song

Collaborations 
 Water Per Person / 一人水一項 (2015) with Selina Ren (Hokkian)
 Peaceful Breakup / 和平分手 (2018) with Rachel Liang

Published works 
 Oral autobiography published in 2002 "I saw the color of notes" (Crown Publishing Group Culture)

Awards and nominations 
 1991 Golden Tripod eighth disabled the first song contest
 1992 Golden Tripod disabled eighth winning singing contests
 1994 International Talent Competition singing group of people with disabilities first
 1994 Golden Lion Award for the visually impaired the first song contest
 1995 / blind school students and younger brother learn the composition of the first visually impaired Orchestra "full-band."
 Special talents in 1996 the International Federation of Association of the Republic of China hosted the national selection of young musicians with disabilities second
 1996 / participation in the United States in Atlanta, 1996 Paralympics, was seventh in judo.  However, his grandmother died before he returned to Taiwan.
 Special talents in 1997 the International Federation of Association of the Republic of China hosted the national selection of disabled young musicians Western music group the second
 1998 Executive Yuan CCA to host "First National Literary Prize for the Physically and Mentally Handicapped," the first songs the creative team
 1998 Taipei Cultural and Educational Foundation, the visually impaired music visually impaired host the sixth group of the first vocal music competitions
 1999 Executive Yuan CCA to host "Second National Literary Award for the Physically and Mentally Handicapped" creative music and lyrics the second group
 Thirty-seventh session in 1999 Ten Outstanding Young
 2000 Executive Yuan CCA to host "The Third National Award for the Physically and Mentally Handicapped Wenhui" music and lyrics create a third group
 2001 Executive Yuan CCA host, "Fourth National Award for the Physically and Mentally Handicapped Wenhui" music and lyrics the creative team first
 2002 / publishing oral autobiography "I saw the color of the notes"
 2003 / December 2002 launch of "You are my eyes", the same name by the "super-Avenue of Stars" contestants Yoga Lin covered again.
 Finalist in 2003 Golden Melody Awards "the best male singing" and "the best lyricist"
 2003 Executive Yuan CCA host "physical and mental disabilities of the Fifth National Wenhui Award" music and lyrics the creative team first
 Finalist in 2005 Golden Melody Awards "best pop vocal album Taiwanese" and "the best male singing Taiwanese people"
 Finalist in 2008 Golden Melody Awards "the best male singing Taiwanese people," "the best Taiwanese language album," ( "true love" album) and "Best Composer" (short-listed entries: "love this song" I love songs in the album included)
 Golden Melody Awards in 2008 "the best male singing Taiwanese" and "the best Taiwanese language album," Prize Winner.

References

External links 
  Official site

Taiwanese Hokkien pop singers
21st-century Taiwanese male actors
Taiwanese male voice actors
Sportspeople from New Taipei
Blind musicians
Living people
1976 births
21st-century Taiwanese male singers
Taiwanese Mandopop singer-songwriters
Judoka at the 1996 Summer Paralympics
Taiwanese male judoka
Paralympic athletes with a vision impairment
Paralympic judoka of Chinese Taipei
Musicians from New Taipei
Male actors from New Taipei
Blind actors
FESPIC Games competitors
Taiwanese people with disabilities